Melanoma-associated antigen D1 is a protein that in humans is encoded by the MAGED1 gene.

Function 

This gene is a member of the melanoma antigen gene (MAGE) family. Most of the genes of this family encode tumor specific antigens that are not expressed in normal adult tissues except testis. Although the protein encoded by this gene shares strong homology with members of the MAGE family, it is expressed in almost all normal adult tissues. This gene has been demonstrated to be involved in the p75 neurotrophin receptor mediated programmed cell death pathway. Three transcript variants encoding two different isoforms have been found for this gene.

MAGED was found to be deleted in a group of children with an intellectual disability disorder caused by a Xp11.22 deletion.

Maged1 plays a role in controlling the reward circuitry in the brain of mice that is responsible for addictive behaviors.

Interactions 

MAGED1 has been shown to interact with UNC5A, PJA1 and XIAP.

References

Further reading